Liberbank was a Spanish financial services company constituted by a merger of Group Cajastur, Caja de Extremadura and Caja Cantabria. It was established from the combination of the assets and liabilities of the banking business (excluding those pertaining to the social work of each savings bank).

Liberbank has a national presence and is a leader in the retail markets of Asturias, Cantabria, Castile-La Mancha and Extremadura.

On 23 May 2011, Effibank was established as a bank SIP Group Cajastur, Caja de Extremadura and Caja Cantabria. From 19 July 2011, the bank operated under the brand Liberbank. Subsequently, the trade name of Effibank (Effibank SA) was also replaced and became Liberbank SA.

On 29 May 2012, Banco Caja3 and Ibercaja merged. Thus born the seventh Spanish financial institution. However, the merger was canceled in October 2012 as a result of the stress test of Oliver Wyman and capital requirements Liberbank scenarios shown in this document.

On 20 December 2012, the European Commission approved the restructuring plan Liberbank, so that this entity to go public in the first half of 2013, reducing its size by 25% compared to 2010. In return, Liberbank received 124 million euros in aid in the form of contingent convertible bonds (cocos) subscribed by the FROB with a maximum repayment term of two years. A drastic reorientation of the business of the bank is also required: must leave in practice real estate, focusing on the credit support to SMEs in their areas of influence and primarily engage in the retail business, limiting their presence in the business of wholesale banking .

On 16 May 2013, Liberbank went public with a sale of redeemable preference shares and subordinated shares in the company and closed the session with a capitalization of 734 million Euro.

On 30 December 2020, it was announced Unicaja was buying Liberbank. The merged company is the fifth largest of Spain.

References

Defunct banks of Spain
banks based in Madrid